Prothereua is a monotypic genus of centipedes in the family Scutigeridae. It is endemic to Australia, with the type locality being Perth in south-west Western Australia. It was described by German myriapodologist Karl Wilhelm Verhoeff in 1925. Its sole species is Prothereua annulata Verhoeff, 1925.

References

 

 
Scutigeridae
Centipede genera
Monotypic arthropod genera
Centipedes of Australia
Endemic fauna of Australia
Fauna of Western Australia
Animals described in 1925
Taxa named by Karl Wilhelm Verhoeff